The Dents de Lanfon (French: Teeth of Lanfon) is a mountain in south-eastern France rising to 1824 m. Situated above Talloires on the east bank of Lac d'Annecy in Haute-Savoie. It is framed by mount Veyrier (1,291 m) to the north, and by Le Lanfonnet (1768 m.) and La Tournette (2,351 m) to the south.

The impressive slopes of the Dents de Lanfon and their position above Lac d'Annecy make them a classic destination for climbers.

External links 
 Crossing of the Dents de Lanfon, climbing with le Club Alpin Français of Chambéry

Mountains of Haute-Savoie
Mountains of the Alps